Mongoose is a supervillain appearing in American comic books published by Marvel Comics.

Publication history

Mongoose first appears in The Amazing Spider-Man #283 and was created by Tom DeFalco and Ron Frenz.

Fictional character biography
Apparently, Mongoose was a real mongoose before his powers were genetically engineered by the High Evolutionary to serve as his agent. At one point, the Mongoose arrives in New York where he is invited by Baron Zemo II to join his Masters of Evil. Mongoose later battles both Spider-Man and Thor, and this confrontation eventually causes Thor and Mongoose to become mortal enemies. After his first defeat at the hands of Thor, Mongoose flees. During his escape, he causes a fall of girders which injures Erik Masterson, who would later become the hero Thunderstrike.

In a later plot against Thor, Mongoose teams up with Quicksand and Count Tagar to obtain cell samples from Thor. He joins Tagar into using a weapon called the "vivisector" to obtain the samples, while Quicksand causes a distraction as she battles Thor so her teammates could obtain what they were after. Tagar hadn't enough from one sample and orders Mongoose to obtain more. Mongoose kidnaps Masterson in return, though against Tagar's wishes. Mongoose also manages to launch an attack against Thor at Wundagore Mountain by the New Men,a collection of genetically altered warriors who defend Wundagore. When Thor eventually realizes what was going on, Mongoose, Quicksand, and Tagar are defeated.  Mongoose once again manages to escape after Tagar halted the battle.

Mongoose tries to rejoin the New Men but is rejected due to his villainous actions. Furious over this, Mongoose later attacks both Thor and Erik Masterson in retaliation. He is about to defeat them, but another God called Hercules steps in to assist. Mongoose realized he had no chance of winning and fled yet again.

Mongoose is arrested by Baron Zemo's Thunderbolts after a battle in Philadelphia. Instead of a legally required trial process, he is offered membership in the team or outright jail. Refusing to go to jail, Mongoose accepts the offer to join the team. 

Mongoose has been identified as one of the 142 registered superheroes who are a part of the Fifty State Initiative.

Alyosha Kraven later began collecting a zoo of animal-themed superhumans, including Bushmaster, Gargoyle, Tiger Shark, Kangaroo, Aragorn, Vulture, Man-Bull, Dragon Man, Swarm, Mandrill, Grizzly, Frog-Man, and Rhino. In the end, the Punisher managed to sabotage this zoo, though Kraven himself escaped to the Savage Land.

Powers and abilities
Genetic engineering by the High Evolutionary granted Mongoose superhuman strength, speed, stamina, agility, and reflexes. He is an excellent hand-to-hand combatant utilizing his superhuman speed and cunning to create his own unique fighting style.

The Mongoose wears artificial claws on his gloves, and uses gas pellets (causing dizziness and disorientation), and a wrist device used to project concussive blasts. He has also carried a cellsmograph, a device for determining the presence of a living being by identifying its genetic structure. He also has access to the advanced sky-craft and land vehicles of Wundagore, and once used a Wundagorian "asteroid blaster" to attack Thor.

References

External links
 Mongoose at Marvel.com

Characters created by Ron Frenz
Characters created by Tom DeFalco
Comics characters introduced in 1988
Fictional genetically engineered characters
Fictional mongooses
Marvel Comics characters who can move at superhuman speeds
Marvel Comics characters with superhuman strength
Marvel Comics supervillains